Michurin Street is a street in Tsentralny City District of Novosibirsk, Russia. It runs south-north. The street starts from Ordzhonikidze Street opposite the Novosibirsk Opera and Ballet Theatre, crosses Yadrintsevskaya, Frunze, Krylov, Gogol streets and then forms a T-intersection with Pisarev Street.

History
The street was previously called the Alexandrovskaya Street, but was renamed in 1920 for Fyodor Serebrennikov, Russian revolutionary.

In the early 1930s, the construction of the Opera and Ballet Theatre began. The new building divided the street into two parts: the name of the southern part has not changed, the northern part was named Michurin Street.

Gallery

Architecture
 Michurin Street 6. The building was probably built in 1900.
 Novosibirsk Marriott Hotel. It is located on the corner of Michurin and Ordzhonikidze streets. The hotel was opened in 2014.

Sports

Sports clubs
 FC Sibir Novosibirsk
 WBC Dynamo Novosibirsk

Sports objects
 Spartak Stadium

Transportation

Tram
Two tram stops are located on the street: 'Stadion Spartak', 'Magazin 1000 melochei'.

Metro
Sibirskaya Station is located on the street.

References

External links
 Serebrennikovskaya Street: 'I'm Novosibirsk. Portrait of the microdistrict'. Vesti.Novosibirsk. Улица Серебренниковская: Я — Новосибирск. Портрет микрорайона. Вести.Новосибирск.

Tsentralny City District, Novosibirsk
Streets in Novosibirsk